Taiser Town or Taiser Town Scheme-45 is a neighborhood in Malir Town in Karachi, Sindh, Pakistan. It was established by the Malir Development Authority to resettle people displaced due to the construction of the Lyari Expressway along the Lyari River. It is located near the Gulshan-e-Maymar toll plaza, northern bypass and Khuda Ki Basti. Taiser Town is also known as Lyari Basti.

Ethnic groups include Bangalis, Muhajirs, Punjabis, Sindhis, Kashmiris, Seraikis, Pakhtuns, Balochis, Memons, Bohras and Ismailis. Over 99% of the population is Muslim and most people are Bangali. The second largest group are Pakhtuns. The population of Malir Town is estimated to be nearly one million. Taiser is near Khuda Ki Basti and the northern bypass. Taiser town people are purchased dirty water for drinking from tanker Mafia. Taiser town people belongs to poor family. Politician of Taiser Town not solved sewerage problem and other problem example drinking water, sewerage, electricity, dustbin (garbage), repairing roads and gas and electricity meter since 2005 etc. now gas & electricity available her 2018.

Etymology
Taiser was a sister of Mokhi (a folk story which is covered in the poetry of Shah Abdul Latif Bhittai), the Taiser town is named after Taiser.

Demographics 
Muhajirs are majority in Taiser town.

See also 
 Malir Development Authority
 Lyari Expressway Resettlement Project
 City District Government Karachi

References

External links 
 Taiser Town
 Taiser Town Scheme to provide shelter to homeless 
 Taiser Town attracts 309,300 applications
 Move from Lyari to Taiser Town brings education and hope
 Resettlement site emerging as model township: Taiser Town

Neighbourhoods of Karachi